South University is a private university with its main campus and online operations in Savannah, Georgia, United States. Founded in 1899, South University consists of its School of Pharmacy, College of Nursing and Public Health, College of Health Professions, College of Business, College of Theology, and College of Arts and Sciences. The university is accredited by the Southern Association of Colleges and Schools Commission on Colleges. South University is owned by Education Principle Foundation (aka Colbeck Foundation), a non-profit which also owns the Art Institutes.

History
South University was founded in Savannah, Georgia, in 1899 as Draughan's Practical Business College.  The private school taught accounting, banking, typewriting, bookkeeping and shorthand.

The South family acquired the institution in 1974 and changed its name to Draughan's Junior College. In 1986, the name was changed to South College. In 2001, the Southern Association of Colleges and Schools accredited South College at the master's level and the school was renamed South University.

The institution's name change to South College resulted in a 2002 legal dispute with Sewanee: The University of the South, which had registered the name "The University of the South" with the U.S. Patent Office. The issue was resolved in 2003 with both schools retaining their names.

In 2003, Education Management Corporation (EDMC) acquired South University. The following year, the university expanded from its main campus in Savannah, Georgia, to eleven other locations in the United States and began offering online courses. Fifty-two percent of South University students were enrolled entirely online.

Scandal and decline (2012-present)

In 2015, EDMC, South University's former parent company, agreed to forgive more than $100.8 million in student loan debt held by more than 80,000 former students.  U.S. Attorney David J. Hickton of the
Western District of Pennsylvania stated that 'Companies cannot enrich their corporate coffers at the expense of students seeking a quality education, or on the backs of taxpayers who are funding our critical financial aid programs ... 'Today's global settlement sends an unmistakable message to all for-profit
education companies: the United States will aggressively ferret out fraud and protect innocent students and taxpayer
dollars from this kind of egregious abuse.'

In December 2016, South University was placed on probation by the Southern Association of Colleges and Schools (SACS) due to financial concerns regarding its parent company at the time, EDMC. South University was removed from probation in December 2017 after the sale to Dream Center Education Holdings and SACS approved the university's conversion to not-for-profit status (although the U.S. Department of Education classifies the institution as for-profit.).

South University's Savannah campus (which includes its online students) celebrated its largest graduating class in the institution's history in June 2017, when more than 3,500 students received degrees. On October 17, 2017, the university's former parent company, Education Management Corporation, reported that it had sold its schools to the Los Angeles-based Dream Center Foundation, a non-profit organization.

In 2019 South University fired a large majority of their workforce including the online support staff located in Chandler, Arizona, closing the site. South University was expected to be transferred to Education Principle Foundation. In the meantime, all South campuses were being operated independently. The court appointed receiver, Studio Enterprise, and the university had until April 11, 2019 to negotiate to separate South & remaining Art Institute schools from the Dream Center Education IT Platform by September 11, 2019. Writing for the Republic Report, David Halperin opined that "[s]hould they fail to agree, the plan of reorganization will likely fail, thereby dooming South University and the Art Institutes." The court-appointed receiver has also reported that "there is a 'scattered matching of revenues and expenses' among all the former EDMC schools, making it difficult to determine the true financial picture at the schools in receivership and those controlled by Education Principle Foundation."

In 2020, South University received $7,726,170 in federal funding under the CARES Act. South was allocated an additional $5.1 million under HEERF II. On December 4, 2020, South University closed on a loan from Blue Ridge Bank under the Federal Reserve's Main Street Lending Program, assuming $50 million in debt, with a $35 million balloon payment in 2025.

In 2021 a class action lawsuit was filed against Education Principle Foundation and South University for making illegal robocalls.

Campuses
Savannah, online (6,724 students)
Montgomery, Alabama (395 students) 
West Palm Beach, Florida (522 students)
Tampa, Florida (809 students)
Savannah, Georgia (787 students) 
Columbia, South Carolina (625 students)
Round Rock (Austin), Texas (359 students) 
Glen Allen (Richmond), Virginia (462 students)
Virginia Beach, Virginia (314 students)

Off-campus instructional sites
Atlanta, Georgia (at the Art Institute of Atlanta)
High Point, North Carolina   
Orlando, Florida

Academics

Faculty
South University relies on an unbundling of academic labor.  The online campus has no full-time instructors and 720 part-time instructors for 5,405 students.  South's largest physical campus, in Tampa, Florida, has 25 full-time instructors and 73 part-time instructors for 867 students.

Accreditation

South University is regionally accredited by the Southern Association of Colleges and Schools Commission on Colleges (SACSCOC) to award doctoral, master's, bachelor's, and associate degrees. The institution is classified by SACSCOC as a Level VI institution, meaning it offers four or more doctoral degree programs. The University also offers post-graduate certificate programs through its College of Nursing and Public Health.

School of Pharmacy

South University became the first university in the Savannah area to offer a health professions doctorate when it launched its Doctor of Pharmacy program in 2002. South University's accelerated Doctor of Pharmacy degree (Pharm.D.) program is one of only a limited number nationwide that provides four academic years of study within three calendar years. The degree program is offered at both the Savannah, Georgia and Columbia, South Carolina campuses.

The Doctor of Pharmacy program is accredited by the Accreditation Council for Pharmacy Education (ACPTE).

College of Health Professions

South University and Emory University are the only two institutions in the state of Georgia that offer a Master of Medical Science in Anesthesia Science program. South University's program is accredited by the Commission on Accreditation of Allied Health Education Programs upon the recommendation of the Accreditation Review Committee for the Anesthesiologist Assistants (ARC-AA). An Anesthesiologist assistant is qualified by virtue of their education and training at the master's degree level to deliver anesthesia as a member of an anesthesia care team led by a physician anesthesiologist.

The University launched its Master of Science in Physician Assistant program in 2002, and it is one of only five programs in the state of Georgia. A Physician Assistant is prepared to work in a medical setting with the ability to evaluate, monitor, diagnose, counsel, refer patients and prescribe medication.

The Master of Science in Physician Assistant program is offered at South University's Savannah, Tampa, West Palm Beach, and Richmond campuses and is accredited by The Accreditation Review Commission on Education for the Physician Assistant (ARC-PA).

College of Nursing and Public Health

South University's College of Nursing and Public Health prepares students to practice at all levels of the nursing profession by providing programs at the bachelor's, master's, doctorate and post-graduate certificate level. Programs include an RN to Bachelor of Science in Nursing and Doctor of Nursing Practice. The University also offers Master of Science with a Specialization in Family Nurse Practitioner.

The institution's College of Nursing and Public Health programs are accredited by the Commission on Collegiate Nursing Education (CCNE)

College of Business

The College of Business offers undergraduate degrees in areas that include business administration, healthcare administration and information technology. Graduate programs include a Master of Business Administration and Accelerated Master of Business Administration (AMBA) in Healthcare Administration.

The Bachelor of Business Administration, Bachelor of Science in Healthcare Management, Master of Business Administration, Accelerated Master of Business Administration, Master of Business Administration in Healthcare Administration and Accelerated Master of Business Administration in Healthcare Administration programs at South University, Savannah are accredited by the Accreditation Council for Business Schools and Programs (ACBSP).

College of Theology

South University's College of Theology was established in 2013, and graduated its first Doctor of Ministry (D.Min.) student in 2016 

The South University College of Theology differs from traditional seminaries, because rather than focusing on the doctrine of one faith, it prepares its students (who come from different denominations and religious backgrounds) to minister in the Christian tradition to people of various faiths and, potentially, in various times of spiritual crisis.

College of Arts & Sciences

The College of Arts & Sciences houses South University's undergraduate programs in Criminal Justice, Legal Studies and Paralegal Studies.

Student body
South University's undergraduate online campus (3,481 students) is 46 percent black, 37 percent white, and 10 percent Hispanic. Eighty-five percent are eligible for low-income Pell Grants and 79 percent receive federal loans.

Student life

Honor societies

South University students are eligible for membership in a number of national and international honor societies. These include the Delta Mu Delta International Honor Society in Business, Sigma Theta Tau, which recognizes outstanding academic achievement by nursing students, and Pi Gamma Mu, which is the International Honor Society in Social Sciences. South University Doctor of Pharmacy students are eligible for membership in Rho Chi, the academic honor society in Pharmacy. South University's College of Theology was granted a chapter of Theta Alpha Kappa, the National Honor Society for Religious Studies and Theology in 2017.

Finances
In 2020, South University had $77 million in assets and $92 million in liabilities, losing $6,054,000 in value. The schools spent $87.4 million on employee compensation and $27.7 million in advertising. Twenty million dollars went to Studio Enterprise. 

According to the US Department of Education's College Scorecard, South University is on Heightened Cash Monitoring 2 "requiring additional oversight because of financial or federal compliance issues."

Student outcomes
According to the College Scorecard, the Savannah online campus has an undergraduate graduation rate of 8 percent. Forty percent of South University's students earn more than a high school graduate after attending. Nine percent of South University's student debtors are making progress with their federal student loans two years after completion.

References

External links 

Educational institutions established in 1899
Universities and colleges accredited by the Southern Association of Colleges and Schools
Private universities and colleges in Georgia (U.S. state)
Universities and colleges in Oakland County, Michigan
Universities and colleges in Savannah, Georgia
1899 establishments in Georgia (U.S. state)